Parliament is a title of certain legislatures. Parliament may also refer to:

Legislatures 
 Parliament of the United Kingdom
 Parliament of Canada

Locations
 Houses of Parliament, UK
 Parliament railway station, Melbourne, Australia
 Parliament station, Ottawa, Canada

Art, entertainment, and media

Games
 Parliament (card game), card game also known as Sevens

Music
 Parliament (band), a funk music band 
 Parliament-Funkadelic, an American funk, soul and rock music collective, headed by George Clinton, whose style has been dubbed P-Funk
 The Parliaments, American doo-wop quintet

Television
 BBC Parliament, TV channel broadcasting footage from British parliaments
 Parliament TV (New Zealand), New Zealand television station

Biology
 A group of owls

Other uses
 Parliament (cigarette), a brand of cigarettes
 Parliamentary procedure, the body of rules, ethics, and customs governing meetings and other operations of clubs, organizations, legislative bodies, and other deliberative assemblies
 Parliament Street (Toronto), a street in Toronto, Ontario, Canada
 Parliament streetcar line, a former streetcar line in Toronto, Ontario, Canada

See also
 Parlement, a type of high court in ancien régime France

 
 
 Parliament Hill (disambiguation)
 Parliament Square (disambiguation)
 Houses of Parliament (disambiguation)
 Parliament House (disambiguation)
 Parliament buildings (disambiguation)
 List of legislative buildings